The  is a children's hospital in Yokohama, Japan. The center is a core facility of pediatric care for Kanagawa Prefecture. It consists of a research institute and hospital, and is now an ancillary establishment of Kanagawa Prefectural Hospital Organization.

History
The Kanagawa Children's Medical Center was established in 1970 as the first children's hospital in Kanagawa Prefecture.

Organization
Hospital
Clinical Research Institute

References

External links
 
KCMC Clinical Research Institute

Hospital buildings completed in 1970
Children's hospitals
Hospitals established in 1970
Hospitals in Yokohama
1970 establishments in Japan
Child-related organizations in Japan